Folsom is an unincorporated community in Callaway County, in the U.S. state of Missouri.

History
A post office called Folsom was established in 1887, and remained in operation until 1905. The community was named after First Lady Frances Folsom Cleveland.

References

Unincorporated communities in Callaway County, Missouri
Unincorporated communities in Missouri
Jefferson City metropolitan area